Photodetectors, also called photosensors, are sensors of light or other electromagnetic radiation. There is a wide variety of photodetectors which may be classified by mechanism of detection, such as photoelectric or photochemical effects, or by various performance metrics, such as spectral response. Semiconductor-based photodetectors typically 
photo detector have a p–n junction that converts light photons into current. The absorbed photons make electron–hole pairs in the depletion region. Photodiodes and photo transistors are a few examples of photo detectors. Solar cells convert some of the light energy absorbed into electrical energy.

Types 

Photodetectors may be classified by their mechanism for detection:
 Photoemission or photoelectric effect: Photons cause electrons to transition from the conduction band of a material to free electrons in a vacuum or gas.
 Thermal: Photons cause electrons to transition to mid-gap states then decay back to lower bands, inducing phonon generation and thus heat.
 Polarization: Photons induce changes in polarization states of suitable materials, which may lead to change in index of refraction or other polarization effects.
 Photochemical: Photons induce a chemical change in a material.
 Weak interaction effects: photons induce secondary effects such as in photon drag detectors or gas pressure changes in Golay cells.

Photodetectors may be used in different configurations. Single sensors may detect overall light levels. A 1-D array of photodetectors, as in a spectrophotometer or a Line scanner, may be used to measure the distribution of light along a line. A 2-D array of photodetectors may be used as an image sensor to form images from the pattern of light before it.

A photodetector or array is typically covered by an illumination window, sometimes having an anti-reflective coating.

Properties 
There are a number of performance metrics, also called figures of merit, by which photodetectors are characterized and compared
 Spectral response: The response of a photodetector as a function of photon frequency.
 Quantum efficiency: The number of carriers (electrons or holes) generated per photon.
 Responsivity: The output current divided by total light power falling upon the photodetector.
 Noise-equivalent power: The amount of light power needed to generate a signal comparable in size to the noise of the device.
 Detectivity: The square root of the detector area divided by the noise equivalent power.
 Gain: The output current of a photodetector divided by the current directly produced by the photons incident on the detectors, i.e., the built-in current gain.
 Dark current: The current flowing through a photodetector even in the absence of light.
 Response time: The time needed for a photodetector to go from 10% to 90% of final output.
 Noise spectrum: The intrinsic noise voltage or current as a function of frequency. This can be represented in the form of a noise spectral density.
 Nonlinearity: The RF-output is limited by the nonlinearity of the photodetector

Devices 
Grouped by mechanism, photodetectors include the following devices:

Photoemission  or photoelectric
 Gaseous ionization detectors are used in experimental particle physics to detect photons and particles with sufficient energy to ionize gas atoms or molecules. Electrons and ions generated by ionization cause a current flow which can be measured.
 Photomultiplier tubes containing a photocathode which emits electrons when illuminated, the electrons are then amplified by a chain of dynodes.
 Phototubes containing a photocathode which emits electrons when illuminated, such that the tube conducts a current proportional to the light intensity.
 Microchannel plate detectors use a porous glass substrate as a mechanism for multiplying electrons. They can be used in combination with a photocathode like the photomultiplier described above, with the porous glass substrate acting as a dynode stage

Semiconductor 
 Active-pixel sensors (APSs) are image sensors.  Usually made in a complementary metal–oxide–semiconductor (CMOS) process, and also known as CMOS image sensors, APSs are commonly used in cell phone cameras, web cameras, and some DSLRs.
 Cadmium zinc telluride radiation detectors can operate in direct-conversion (or photoconductive) mode at room temperature, unlike some other materials (particularly germanium) which require liquid nitrogen cooling. Their relative advantages include high sensitivity for x-rays and gamma-rays, due to the high atomic numbers of Cd and Te, and better energy resolution than scintillator detectors.
 Charge-coupled devices (CCD) are image sensors which are used to record images in astronomy, digital photography, and digital cinematography. Before the 1990s, photographic plates were most common in astronomy.  The next generation of astronomical instruments, such as the Astro-E2, include cryogenic detectors.
 HgCdTe infrared detectors. Detection occurs when an infrared photon of sufficient energy kicks an electron from the valence band to the conduction band. Such an electron is collected by a suitable external readout integrated circuits (ROIC) and transformed into an electric signal.
 LEDs which are reverse-biased to act as photodiodes. See LEDs as photodiode light sensors.
 Photoresistors or Light Dependent Resistors (LDR) which change resistance according to light intensity. Normally the resistance of LDRs decreases with increasing intensity of light falling on it.
 Photodiodes which can operate in photovoltaic mode or photoconductive mode. Photodiodes are often combined with low-noise analog electronics to convert the photocurrent into a voltage that can be digitized.
 Phototransistors, which act like amplifying photodiodes.
 Pinned photodiodes, a photodetector structure with low lag, low noise, high quantum efficiency, and low dark current, widely used in most CCD and CMOS image sensors.
 Quantum dot photoconductors or photodiodes, which can handle wavelengths in the visible and infrared spectral regions.
 Semiconductor detectors are employed in gamma and X-ray spectrometry and as particle detectors.
 Silicon drift detectors (SDDs) are X-ray radiation detectors used in x-ray spectrometry (EDS) and electron microscopy (EDX).

Photovoltaic 
 Photovoltaic cells or solar cells which produce a voltage and supply an electric current when sunlight or certain kinds of light shines on them.

Thermal 
 Bolometers measure the power of incident electromagnetic radiation via the heating of a material with a temperature-dependent electrical resistance. A microbolometer is a specific type of bolometer used as a detector in a thermal camera.
 Cryogenic detectors are sufficiently sensitive to measure the energy of single x-ray, visible and infrared photons.
 Pyroelectric detectors detect photons through the heat they generate and the subsequent voltage generated in pyroelectric materials.
 Thermopiles detect electromagnetic radiation through heat, then generating a voltage in thermocouples. 
 Golay cells detect photons by the heat they generate in a gas-filled chamber, causing the gas to expand and deform a flexible membrane whose deflection is measured.

Photochemical 
 Photoreceptor cells in the retina detect light through, for instance, a rhodopsin photon-induced chemical cascade.
 Chemical detectors, such as photographic plates, in which a silver halide molecule is split into an atom of metallic silver and a halogen atom. The photographic developer causes adjacent molecules to split similarly.

Polarization 
 The photorefractive effect is used in holographic data storage.
 Polarization-sensitive photodetectors use optically anisotropic materials to detect photons of a desired linear polarization.

Graphene/silicon photodetectors 
A graphene/n-type silicon heterojunction has been demonstrated to exhibit strong rectifying behavior and high photoresponsivity.  Graphene is coupled with silicon quantum dots (Si QDs) on top of bulk Si to form a hybrid photodetector.  Si QDs cause an increase of the built-in potential of the graphene/Si Schottky junction while reducing the optical reflection of the photodetector. Both the electrical and optical contributions of Si QDs enable a superior performance of the photodetector.

Frequency range 
In 2014 a technique for extending semiconductor-based photodetector's frequency range to longer, lower-energy wavelengths. Adding a light source to the device effectively "primed" the detector so that in the presence of long wavelengths, it fired on wavelengths that otherwise lacked the energy to do so.

See also 
 Lighting control system
 List of sensors
 Optoelectronics
 Photoelectric sensor
 Photosensitivity
 Readout integrated circuit
 Resonant-cavity-enhanced photo detector
 Photodetection

References

External links